"Lisa Simpson, This Isn't Your Life" is the fifth episode of the twenty-second season of the American animated television series The Simpsons. It first aired on the Fox network in the United States on November 14, 2010.

Plot
After finding out that Maggie is upset about missing one of the collectible Happy Little Elves on the last day of a promotional giveaway, Homer drives the family to a gas station owned by Texxon, the company responsible for the giveaway. This leads to Homer continually buying gas to try and win the rare "Baby Must Have" toy, which Maggie wants. Failing after at least six attempts, they end up driving through the district of town where Marge grew up. While visiting her mom's old house, Lisa discovers that Marge was a high-achieving, honor roll student. Shocked, Lisa asks Principal Skinner about it, and he confirms that Marge was very intelligent in her infancy, but this has not prevented her from ending up like a stereotypical stay-at-home mother. Skinner warns her that she will likely have the same future because, despite her potential, Skinner knows by experience that children often have the same fate of their parents. Meanwhile, during a stunt through the poorly drained school playground, Bart gets mud all over Nelson. When Nelson goes to punch him, Bart slips and inadvertently kicks Nelson in the face, leading the other kids to view Bart as the new school bully.

Lisa discovers that Marge's grades plummeted after she met Homer, and so aims not to get distracted. She clears her room of everything that might take her attentions from her goal of a "long, happy life", including her saxophone. Marge finds out Lisa wants to be nothing like her and although Lisa tries to soften her criticism, Marge becomes noticeably cold towards her daughter (and more visibly happy with Bart for wanting to be like her). Though inept, Homer tries to help Lisa cope the best way he can with Marge's distance to her. At school, Nelson confronts Bart at the tetherball, and takes a swing at him. Nelson misses and strikes the ball, which comes around and hits him by mistake, knocking him over. Another similar incident occurs in the hall, where Nelson walks into a locker and gets trapped inside.

Lisa finds out about Cloisters Academy, a prestigious school where she feels she will learn better, and tries to persuade her parents to let her go there. Marge is against it, saying it's too expensive and the principal's comment insults her. After the Cloisters principal and Marge ostensibly discuss Lisa's record, she believes that she is offered a scholarship there. Taking advice from Marge, Bart tries to stop Nelson from attacking him by making Nelson feel good about himself, and Nelson actually accepts the praise, ending their dispute. That night, Lisa discovers that she has not been offered a scholarship; she was only accepted due to Marge agreeing to do all of the school's laundry. Even worse, Marge has become an overtired, overworked drudge as a result. Lisa tells Marge she does not want to go to Cloisters anymore, saying it is "too elitist", and would be honored to be like her mother. However, she turns away to avoid showing Marge a guilty look that she has on her face. Homer steals a Baby Must Have from the Texxon store from earlier to keep Maggie happy, knowing that the station has no glass windows. The owner arrives on the scene and asks if the robber took any money. When told it was just the toys, the owner says "He did now!" and the episode ends with him stuffing his pockets out of the register, much to the disbelief of his store manager.

Reception
In its original American broadcast, "Lisa Simpson, This Isn't Your Life" was viewed by 8.97 million households receiving a 3.9 rating and a 10 share of the audience among adults between the ages of 18 and 49 coming second in its timeslot after NBC Sunday Night Football. It was the thirteenth most viewed show of the week amongst adults 18-49.

Emily VanDerWerff of The A.V. Club gave the episode a positive review calling it the "best episode of the season so far this week". and felt that "having her directly turn those feelings of inadequacy back on her mother was a nice turn, and the story made good use of the Marge and Lisa relationship as its emotional core", rating the episode with a B+.

Eric Hochberger of TV Fanatic gave the episode 4 out of 5 stars, saying the episode was "the strongest of a fairly decent season of The Simpsons".

References

External links

"Lisa Simpson, This Isn't Your Life" at theSimpsons.com

2010 American television episodes
The Simpsons (season 22) episodes